Jean-Baptiste Victor Hugues sometimes spelled Hughes (July 20, 1762 in Marseille – August 12, 1826 in Cayenne) was a French politician and colonial administrator during the French Revolution, who governed Guadeloupe from 1794 to 1798, emancipating the island's slaves under orders from the National Convention.

Early life and appointment

Jean-Baptiste Victor Hugues was born to a rich family of Marseille's bourgeoisie, son of Jean-François Hugues (1725–1789), a salesman, and Catherine Fodrin (1729–1822), issued from a family of silk traders of Saint-Étienne.

The family settled as colonists in Saint-Domingue at the beginning of the 1780s, but Victor was forced to return to France because of the Haitian Revolution. He was then appointed Procureur of the Comité de salut public in La Rochelle with the support of the local Jacobin Club. He was subsequently appointed governor of Guadeloupe, where he was ordered to apply the emancipation decrees which declared the end of slavery in all French territories in February 1794.

Conflicts with Great Britain and the United States
Following the signing of the Whitehall Accord by (representing Guadeloupe), a British task force successfully captured the island in April 1794. The planters and other French Royalists had signed the Whitehall Accord with the British as a way of rejecting the revolutionary events in France, particularly the abolition of slavery. When Hugues disembarked on 21 May 1794, he had a small force of 1,150 soldiers. He immediately declared an end to slavery and so rallied the slaves and gens de couleur. Within five days he took the capital, Pointe-à-Pitre. Hugues was able to retake the island by 6 October 1794, when he obliged the British general to surrender in his camp of Barville with his entire force, in which were comprised 800 French emigres and 900 black soldiers. He led a failed attempt to capture Anguilla in 1796.

Even though he abolished chattel slavery, he still maintained a system of unpaid obligatory work. He reorganised the army, recruiting a large number of freed African slaves, until his armed force amounted to around 10,000 men. Soldiers of both African and European descent were integrated into the same units with no racial distinctions.

He ruled for four years before being recalled to France and was replaced by General Edme Desfourneaux. During that time, he purged the island of counter-revolutionaries, using a guillotine brought from France, and also worked to create a viable post-slavery regime, in which the island's farms and plantations still functioned.

Hugues is perhaps best known for authorizing privateers to attack shipping through the Caribbean, which brought great wealth to the island but also was part of the tensions between France and the United States (known as the Quasi-War in American history).

With an army composed of White, Mulatto and ex-slave soldiers, Hugues worked to export the revolution to neighboring islands, including Dominica, Saint-Martin, Grenada, Saint Vincent and Saint Lucia. On 18 April 1795 he landed in Saint Lucia with 600 soldiers. They joined the 250 local white Republicans and 300 blacks Republicans, most of them carrying pikes, but some with captured muskets from the local garrison. The British from Castries landed over a thousand troops at Vieux Fort and marched them overland to Soufriere. They attacked on April 22 at Fond Doux and Rabot. However, after heavy fighting the British were forced to withdraw back to Castries. They were eventually defeated on June 19, and withdrew from the island. The Royalist French planters fled with them, leaving their slaves to be liberated by Hugues.

Guiana
In 1799, Hugues was envoyed to French Guiana by the French Consulate, where he was responsible for legislating unfree labour, and then slavery itself. He remained an administrator under the First Empire, but was forced out when an Anglo-Portuguese force under the command of Captain Yeo of HMS Confiance re-captured the colony from French hands on 14 January 1809.

Upon his return, he was prosecuted for treason and conspiracy with the enemy. Acquitted in 1814, he returned to Guiana in 1817, served as governor, and then stayed on as a private citizen.

Cuban writer Alejo Carpentier made Hugues protagonist of his acclaimed novel "El Siglo de las Luces" (Explosion in a Cathedral), published in 1962.

American author, James A. Michener, includes an accounting of Hugues' time spent on Guadeloupe in Michener's work of historical fiction: The Caribbean. In the chapter entitled 'The Creoles', Michener includes both historical facts about the man, and adds him to several fictional situations and plot twists. The Caribbean was published in 1989.

References

External links
 Hugues, Victor. "Guyane française. Code civil. Avec modifications, ordonnance coloniale du 1er Vendémiaire an XIV (23 septembre 1805), pour son introduction dans cette colonie", Cayenne, Imprimerie du roi, 1822.  
 Sainte-Croix de La Roncière, Georges de. "Grandes Figures coloniales : Victor Hugues, le conventionnel", Paris, chez l'auteur, 1932. 
 Lara Henri Adolphe. "Contribution de la Guadeloupe à la pensée française : 1635-1935", Paris, Jean Crès, 1936. 
 Brard, René. "Le dernier caraïbe", Bordeaux, chez l'auteur, 1849.

See also 
Explosion in a Cathedral Alejo Carpentier: El Siglo de Las Luces. Seix Barral. Barcelona 1962

French abolitionists
French colonial governors and administrators
1761 births
1826 deaths
French colonial governors of Guadeloupe
Military leaders of the French Revolutionary Wars
Hughes, Victor
Politicians of the First French Empire
Governors of French Guiana
Politicians from Marseille
People acquitted of treason
Republicanism in Saint Lucia
19th century in French Guiana
18th-century French politicians
18th century in Guadeloupe